The National Democratic Alliance (NDA) is a big tent political alliance led by Bharatiya Janata Party (BJP). , it is the ruling coalition in the Parliament of India under the leadership of Prime Minister Narendra Modi, from 2019 to 2024 and rules over 14  state governments as on 24 May 2019.

The NDA was formed by the BJP in the 1998 general elections; it consisted of its existing allies like the Janata Dal (United), the All India Anna Dravida Munnetra Kazhagam,  Biju Janata Dal and Lok Janshakti Party. The coalition first came to power at the Central Government after the 1998 general elections, and continued to rule till 2004.

List of members

Source:

Past members

Notes

References

External links 
 

Bharatiya Janata Party

India politics-related lists